The 2021 Grand Prix de Fourmies was the 88th edition of the Grand Prix de Fourmies, a one-day road cycling race in and around Fourmies in northern France. This edition was the race's first in the UCI ProSeries; the 2020 edition was expected to feature in the inaugural UCI ProSeries but was cancelled due to the COVID-19 pandemic. It was also the ninth event of the 2021 French Road Cycling Cup.

Teams 
Ten of the nineteen UCI WorldTeams, ten UCI ProTeams, and two UCI Continental teams made up the twenty-two teams that participated in the race. In total, 150 riders started the race, of which 134 finished.

UCI WorldTeams

 
 
 
 
 
 
 
 
 
 

UCI ProTeams

 
 
 
 
 
 
 
 
 
 

UCI Continental Teams

Result

References

Sources

External links 
 

2021
Grand Prix de Fourmies
Grand Prix de Fourmies
Grand Prix de Fourmies
Grand Prix de Fourmies